This list of organizations historically described as Communist fronts by the United States federal government includes the names of groups included in various reports of the Attorney General of the United States or House Un-American Activities Committee listing "subversive" or "Communist" front groups. While some of these were documentable mass organizations of the Communist Party USA, many were included out of convenience or political expedience.

Inclusion on any of these lists should not be regarded as definitive proof of covert organizational ties or actual subversive intent.

1948 Attorney General's list 

 Abraham Lincoln Brigade
 Abraham Lincoln School, Chicago, Illinois
 Action Committee to Free Spain Now
 Alabama People's Educational Association
 American Association for Reconstruction in Yugoslavia Inc.
 American Branch of the Federation of Greek Maritime Unions
 American Committee for Protection of Foreign Born
 American Committee for Spanish Freedom
 American Committee for the Settlement of Jews in Birbidjan, Inc.
 American Committee for Yugoslav Relief Inc.
 American Committee to Survey Labor Conditions in Europe
 American Committee for a Democratic Greece
 American Council on Soviet Relations
 American Jewish Labor Council
 American League Against War and Fascism
 American League for Peace and Democracy
 American Peace Crusade
 American Peace Mobilization
 American Poles for Peace
 American Polish Labor Council
 American Polish League
 American Rescue Ship Mission
 American Russian Institute
 American Russian Institute, Philadelphia 
 American Russian Institute of San Francisco
 American Russian Institute of Southern California, Los Angeles 
 American Slav Congress
 American Women for Peace
 American Youth Congress
 American Youth for Democracy
 Armenian Progressive League of America
 Benjamin Davis Freedom Committee
 Boston School for Marxist Studies
 Bridges-Robertson-Schmidt Defense Committee
 Bulgarian American People's League of the United States of America
 California Emergency Defense Committee
 California Labor School Inc., San Francisco
 Carpatho-Russian People's Society
 Cervantes Fraternal Society
 China Welfare Appeal Inc.
 Chopin Cultural Center
 Citizens Committee for Harry Bridges
 Citizens Committee of the Upper West Side, New York City
 Citizens Committee to free Earl Browder
 Citizens Emergency Defense Committee
 Citizens Protective League
 Civil Liberties Sponsoring Committee of Pittsburgh
 Civil Rights Congress
 Comite Coordinador Pro Republica Española
 Comite Pro Derechos Civiles
 Committee for a Democratic Far Eastern Policy
 Committee for Constitutional and Political Freedom
 Committee for Peace and Brotherhood Festival in Philadelphia
 Committee for the Defense of the Pittsburgh Six
 Committee for the Negro in the Arts
 Committee for the Protection of the Bill of Rights
 Committee for World Youth Friendship and Cultural Exchange
 Committee to Abolish Discrimination in Maryland
 Committee to Defend the Rights and Freedom of Pittsburgh's Political Prisoners]
 Committee to Uphold the Bill of Rights Commonwealth College, Mena, Arkansas
 Communist Party, USA, its subdivisions, subsidiaries and affiliates
 Communist Political Association, its subdivisions, subsidiaries and affiliates including: 
 Alabama People's Educational Association
 Florida Press and Educational League
 Oklahoma League for Political Education
 People's Educational and Press Association of Texas
 Virginia League for People's Education
 Congress against Discrimination
 Congress of American Revolutionary Writers
 Congress of American Women Congress of the Unemployed
 Connecticut Committee to Aid Victims of the Smith Act
 Connecticut Ste Youth Conference]]
 Council for Jobs, Relief and Housing
 Council for Pan-American Democracy
 Council of Greek American
 Council on African Affairs
 Daily Worker Press Club
 Dennis Defense Committee
 Detroit Youth Assembly
 East Bay Peace Committee
 Emergency Committee to Save Spanish Refugees
 Everybody's Committee to Outlaw War
 Families of the Baltimore Smith Act Victim
 Families of the Smith Act Victims
 Finnish-American Mutual Aid Society
 Frederick Douglass Educational Center
 Freedom Stage, Inc.
 Friends of the Soviet Union
 George Washington Carver School, New York City 
 Harlem Trade Union Council
 Hawaii Civil Liberties Committee
 Hellenic-American Brotherhood
 Hollywood Writers Mobilization for Democracy
 Hungarian-American Council for Democracy
 Hungarian Brotherhood
 Idaho Pension Union
 Independent Party, Seattle
 Industrial Workers of the World
 International Labor Defense
 International Workers Order, its subdivisions, subsidiaries and affiliates
 Jewish Culture Society
 Jewish People's Committee
 Jewish People's Fraternal Order
 Joint Anti-Fascist Refugee Committee
 Joseph Weydemeyer School of Social Science, St. Louis
 Labour Council for Negro Rights
 Labor Research Association
 Labor Youth League
 League for Common Sense
 League of American Writers
 Macedonian-American People's League
 Maritime Labor Committee to Defend Al Lannon
 Massachusetts Committee for the Bill of Rights
 Massachusetts Minute Women for Peace
 Maurice Braverman Defense Committee
 Michigan Civil Rights Federation
 Michigan Council for Peace
 Michigan School of Social Science
 National Association of Mexican Americans
 National Committee for Freedom of the Press
 National Committee for the Defense of Political Prisoners
 National Committee to Win Amnesty for Smith Act Victims
 National Committee to Win the Peace
 National Conference on American Policy in China and the Far East
 National Council for American-Soviet Friendship
 National Federation for Constitutional Liberties
 National Labor Conference for Peace
 National Negro Congress
 National Negro Labor Council
 Nature Friends of America
 Negro Labor Victory Committee
 New Committee for Publications
 North American Committee to Aid Spanish Democracy
 North American Spanish Aid Committee
 North Philadelphia Forum
 Ohio School of Social Sciences
 Oklahoma Committee to Defend Political Prisoners
 Pacific Northwest Labor School, Seattle
 Palo Alto Peace Club
 Peace Information Center
 Peace Movement of Ethiopia
 People's Drama, Inc.
 People's Educational Association (Los Angeles Educational Center) 
 People's Institute of Applied Religion
 People's Programs, Seattle
 People's Radio Foundation, Inc.
 Philadelphia Labor Committee for Negro Rights 
 Philadelphia School of Social Science and Art
 Photo League
 Pittsburgh Art Club
 Political Prisoners' Welfare Committee 
 Polonia Society of the IWO
 Proletarian Party of America
 Protestant War Veterans of the USA
 Provisional Committee of Citizens for Peace, Southwest Area Provisional Committee on Latin American Affairs
 Quad City Committee for Peace
 Queensborough Tenants League
 Revolutionary Workers League
 Romanian-American Fraternal Society
 Russian American Society, Inc.
 Samuel Adams School, Boston
 Santa Barbara Peace Forum
 Schappes Defense Committee
 Schneiderman-Darcy Defense Committee
 School of Jewish Studies
 Seattle Labor School
 Serbian-American Fraternal Society
 Serbian Vidovidan Council
 Slavic Council of Southern California
 Slovak Workers Society
 Slovenian-American National Council
 Socialist Workers Party including: 
 American Committee for European Workers' Relief
 Southern Negro Youth Congress
 Syracuse Women for Peace
 Tom Paine School of Westchester, New York 
 Trade Union Committee for Peace
 Trade Unionists for Peace
 Tri-State Negro Trade Union Council
 Ukrainian-American Fraternal Union
 Union of New York Veterans
 United American Spanish Aid Committee
 United Committee of Jewish Societies and Landsmannschaft
 United Committee of South Slavic American
 United Defense Council of Southern California
 United Harlem Tenants and Consumers Organization
 United May Day Committee
 United Negro and Allied Veterans of America
 United World Federalists
 Veterans of the Abraham Lincoln Brigade
 Virginia League for People's Education
 Voice of Freedom Committee
 Walt Whitman School of Social Science, Newark, New Jersey 
 Washington Bookshop Association
 Washington Committee for Democratic Action
 Washington Committee to Defend the Bill of Rights
 Washington Commonwealth Federation
 Washington Pension Union
 Wisconsin Conference on Social Legislation
 Workers Alliance Yiddisher Kultur Farband
 Young Communist League
 Yugoslav-American Cooperative Home, Inc.
 Yugoslav Seamen's Club, Inc.

1961 HUAC guide 

On December 1, 1961 the House Un-American Activities Committee (HUAC) published a 288-page book entitled Guide to Subversive Organizations and Publications. This massive list, annotated with notes documenting the first official government mention of alleged Communist affiliation, superseded a very similar list published on January 2, 1957. The style of the publication follows that of a 1948 HUAC pamphlet, Citations by Official Government Agencies of Organizations and Publications Found to be Communist or Communist Fronts.

 Abolish Peonage Committee
 Abraham Lincoln Brigade
 Abraham Lincoln School, Chicago
 Action Committee to Free Spain Now
 Adolph Larson-Ruby Hynes Defense Committee
 Alabama Peoples Educational Association
 Albanian-American Committee for Protection of Foreign Born
 Alex Bittelman Defense Committee
 All-America Anti-Imperialist League
 All-California Conference for Defense of Civil Rights and Aid to Labor's Prisoners
 Allied Labor News Service
 Almanac Singers
 Ambijan Committee for Emergency Aid to the Soviet Union
 American Association for Reconstruction in Yugoslavia, Inc.
 American Branch of the Federation of Greek Maritime Unions
 American Committee for a Free Yugoslavia
 American Committee for Democracy and Intellectual Freedom
 American Committee for European Workers' Relief
 American Committee for Friendship with the Soviet Union
 American Committee to Survey Trade Union Conditions in Europe
 American Continental Congress for Peace
 American Council for a Democratic Greece
 American Council on Soviet Relations
 American Croatian Congress
 American Federation of Labor Trade Union Committee for Unemployment Insurance and Relief
 American Friends of Spanish Democracy
 American Friends of the Chinese People
 American Friends of the Mexican People
 American Fund for Public Service
 American Jewish Labor Council
 American Labor Alliance
 American Labor Party
 American League Against War and Fascism
 American League for Peace and Democracy
 American Negro Labor Congress
 American Peace Appeal
 American Peace Crusade
 American Peace Mobilization
 American People's Congress and Exposition for Peace (Chicago: June 29-July 1, 1951)
 American People's Fund
 American People's Meeting
 American People's Mobilization
 American-Polish Committee for Protection of Foreign Born
 American Polish Labor Council
 American Relief Ship for Spain
 American Rescue Ship Mission
 American-Rumanian Film Corp.
 American-Russian Fraternal Society
 American-Russian Institute, New York
 American Russian Institute, Philadelphia
 American Russian Institute of San Francisco
 American Russian Institute of Southern California, Los Angeles
 American-Russian Trading Corp. (Amtorg)
 American Serbian Committee for Relief of War Orphans in Yugoslavia
 American Slav Congress
 American Society for Cultural Relations with Russia
 American Society for Technical Aid to Spanish Democracy
 American-Soviet Science Society
 American Sponsoring Committee for Representation at the Second World Peace Congress
 American Student Union
 American Students Repudiate Aggression in Russia
 American Technical Aid Society
 American Veterans for Peace
 American Women for Peace
 American Workers Party (1933-1934)
 American Writers Congress
 American Youth Congress
 American Youth for a Free World
 American Youth for Democracy
 American Youth Peace Crusade
 American-Yugoslav Committee for Protection of Foreign Born
 Armenian Progressive League of America
 Artists' Front to Win the War
 Association of Interns and Medical Students
 Baltimore County Committee for Peace
 Baltimore Youth for Peace
 Bay Area Committee to Save the Rosenbergs
 Bay Area Rosenberg-Sobell Committee
345 Franklin Street, San Francisco, California
 Bay Area Council of Sobell Committees
 Bay Cities Committee for Protection of Foreign Born
 Book Union
 Boston Committee to Secure Clemency for the Rosenbergs
 Boston School for Marxist Studies
 Bridges-Robertson-Schmidt Defense Committee
 Briehl's Farm, near Wallkill, NY
 Bronx Victory Labor Committee
 Brookwood Labor College
 Bulgarian-American Committee for Protection of Foreign Born
 California Emergency Defense Committee
 California Labor School, San Francisco and Los Angeles
 Cambridge Youth Council
 Camp Arcadia
 Camp Beacon
 Camp Kinderland, Hopewell Junction, NY
 Camp Lakeland, Hopewell Junction, NY
 Camp Timberline, Jewett, NY
 Camp Unity, Wingdale, NY
 Camp Woodland, Phoenicia, NY
 Carpatho-Russian Peoples Society
 Central Council of American Women of Croatian Descent
 Cervantes Fraternal Society
 Charles Doyle Defense Committee
 Charles Rowoldt Defense Committee
 Chicago Committee to Secure Justice in the Rosenberg Case
 Chicago Greek Committee for Protection of Foreign Born
 Chicago Jewish Committee for Protection of Foreign Born
 Chicago Labor Defense Committee
 Chicago Sobell Committee
 China Aid Council
 Citizens Committee for Constitutional Liberties 
 Citizens' Committee for Harry Bridges
 Citizens' Committee of the Upper West Side, New York City
 Citizens' Committee to Free Earl Browder
 Citizens Committee to Preserve American Freedoms
 Civil Rights Congress
 Civil Rights Congress Bail Funds
 Civil Rights Division of Mobilization for Democracy
 Clatsop County Committee for Protection of Foreign Born, Oregon
 Cleveland Committee to Secure Clemency for the Rosenbergs
 Colorado Committee to Protect Civil Liberties
 Colorado Peace Council
 Columbus Peace Association
 Comite Coordinator por Republica Española
 Committee for a Democratic Far Eastern Policy
 Committee for Citizenship Rights
 Committee for Civil Rights for Communists
 Committee for Concerned Peace Efforts
 Committee for Defense of Greek-Americans
 Committee for Defense of Martin Karasek, Bettendorf, IA
 Committee for Defense of Morning Freiheit Writers
 Committee for Defense of Public Education
 Committee for International Student Cooperation
 Committee for Peace Through World Cooperation
 Committee for Peaceful Alternatives to the Atlantic Pact
 Conference for Peaceful Alternatives to the Atlantic Pact
 Committee for the Defense of Eulalia Figueiredo, New Bedford, MA
 Committee for the Freedom of Martin Young
 Committee for the Freedom of Sam Milgrom
 Committee for United States Participation in the American Continental Congress for Peace
 Committee in Defense of Henry Podolski, Detroit
 Committee of Philadelphia Women for Peace
 Committee of Professional Groups for Browder and Ford
 Committee on Election Rights
 Committee to Aid the Fighting South
 Committee to Defend America by Keeping Out of War
 Committee to Defend Angelo Herndon
 Committee to Defend Chungsoon and Choon Cha Kwak
 Committee to Defend Hazel Wolf
 Committee to Defend Lincoln Veterans
 Committee to Defend Mike Daniels
 Committee to Defend Toma Babin
 Committee to End Sedition Laws
 Committee to Protect Joseph Mankin's Citizenship
 Committee to Repeal the Walter-McCarran Law and Stop Deportation of Sam and Fanny Mankewitz
 Committee to Repeal the Walter-McCarran Law and to Protect the Foreign Born, Philadelphia
 Committee to Save the Life of John Juhn
 Commonwealth College, Mena, AR
 Communist Information Bureau
 Communist Labor Party of America
 Communist League of America (Opposition)
 Communist League of Struggle
 Communist Party of America (1919-1923)
 Communist Party of the United States of America
 Communist Party, USA (Majority Group)
 Communist Party, USA (Opposition)
 Independent Communist Labor League of America
 Independent Labor League of America
 Communist Political Association (1944-1945)
 Community Unitarian Fellowship
 Conference for Legislation in the National Interest
 Conference for Progressive Labor Action
 Conference on Constitutional Liberties in America
 Conference on Pan-American Democracy
 Congress of the Mexican and Spanish-American Peoples of the United States, (Albuquerque: March 24–26, 1939)
 Congress of Revolutionary Writers
 Congress of American-Soviet Friendship
 Congress of American Women
 Connecticut State Youth Conference
 Connecticut Volunteers for Civil Rights
 Consumers' National Federation
 Coordinating Committee to Lift the Embargo (Spanish)
 Council for Pan-American Democracy
 Council of United States Veterans
 Council of Young Southerners
 Council on African Affairs
 Croatian Benevolent Fraternity
 Cultural and Scientific Conference for World Peace
 Czechoslovak Committee for Protection of Foreign Born
 Daily Worker Press Club
 Daniels DEfense Committee, North Carolina
 Delegates' National Assembly for Peace (Washington, DC: April 1, 1952)
 Dennis Defense Committee
 Denver Peace Council
 Descendants of the American Revolution
 Detroit Bill of Rights Defense Committee
 Detroit Committee for Protection of Foreign Born
 Detroit Committee to Secure Justice in the Rosenberg Case
 Detroit Youth Assembly
 Dora Coleman Defense Committee
 Down River Citizens Committee, Detroit
 Downtown Club, Los Angeles
 East Bay Committee for Protection of Foreign Born
 East Bay Peace Committee, Oakland
 East Harlem Women for Peace
 East Los Angeles Defense Committee
 East Meadow and Westbury Rosenberg Committee
 East Side Committee for Protection of Foreign Born, Los Angeles
 Eisler Defense Fund
 Emergency Civil Liberties Committee
 Emergency Committee of the Arts and Professions to Secure Clemency for the Rosenbergs
 Emergency Conference to Aid the Spanish Republic
 Emergency Conference to Save Spanish Refugees
 Emergency Peace Mobilization
 Emergency Trade Union Conference to Aid Spanish Democracy
 Emory Collier Defense Committee
 Estonian Committee for Protection of Foreign Born
 Films for Democracy
 Finnish American Freedom Committee
 Finnish-American Mutual Aid Society
 Florida Press and Educational League
 Frances Vivian Defense Committee
 Frank Ibanez Defense Committee
 Frank Spector Defense Committee
 Freedom of the Press Committee Against Deportation
 Friends and Neighbors of David Hyun
 Friends of Chinese Democracy
 Friends of Diamond Kimm
 Friends of Soviet Russia
 Friends of the Soviet Union
 Friends of the Abraham Lincoln Brigade
 Friends of the Campus
 Frontier Bookstore, Seattle
 Frontier Films
 Fund for Social Analysis
 George Washington Carver School, New York City
 Georgia Peace Council
 Gosman-Fabian Defense Committee
 Great Neck Rosenberg Committee
 Greater New York Committee for Employment
 Greater New York Emergency Conference on Inalienable Rights
 Greek-American Committee for Defense of Peter Harisiades
 Greek-American Committee for National Unity
 Greek-American Committee for Protection of Foreign Born, Detroit
 Greek-American Council
 Greek-American Defense Committee, Detroit
 Gus Polites Defense Committee
 Harbor Committee for Protection of Foreign Born, Los Angeles
 Harlem Youth Congress
 Harry Bridges Defense Committee
 Harry Bridges Victory Committee
 Hawaii Civil Liberties Committee
 Hellenic-American Brotherhood
 Hempstead Rosenberg Committee
 Henry Steinberg Defense Committee
 Hollywood Writers Mobilization for Defense
 Housewives Protest Committee, Pittsburgh
 Hungarian-American Committee for Protection of Foreign Born
 Hungarian-American Council for Democracy
 Hungarian-American Defense Committee
 Hungarian Brotherhood
 Ida Gottesman Defense Committee
 Illinois Chapter of the American Peace Crusade
 Illinois People's Conference for Legislative Action
 Independent Citizens Committee of the Arts, Sciences, and Professions
 Independent Progressive Party
 Independent Voters League, Pittsburgh
 Institute of Marxist Studies
 Institute of Pacific Relations
 Intercontinent News Service
 International Association of Democratic Lawyers
 International Book Store, Inc., San Francisco
 International Committee of Intellectuals in Defense of Peace
 International Juridicial Association
 International Labor Defense
 International Music Bureau
 Intourist
 Irving Peace Theater
 irwin Franklin Defense Committee
 Italian-American Committee for Protection of Foreign Born, Detroit
 Italian Anti-Fascist Committee
 James Keller Defense Committee
 Japanese American Committee for Democracy
 Jefferson School Bookshop
 Jefferson School of Social Science
 Jewish People's Committee
 Jewish People's Fraternal Order
 John Reed Clubs of the United States
 John Santo Defense Committee
 Joint Anti-Fascist Refugee Committee
 Joint Committee for Trade Union Rights
 Joint Defense Committee
 Joseph Weydemeyer School of Social Science, St. Louis
 King-Ramsey-Conner Defense Committee
 Korean-American Deportees Defense Committee
 Labor Research Association
 Labor Youth League
 Larry Davis Defense Committee
 Latvian Committee for Protection of Foreign Born
 Laurenti Defense Committee, Akron
 Lawyers Committee on American Relations with Spain
 Lawyers Committee to Keep the United States Out of War
 League for Mutual Aid

See also

 List of members of the House Un-American Activities Committee

Footnotes

Legal history of the United States
Anti-communism in the United States
Cold War history of the United States
Political repression in the United States
McCarthyism
Communist front organizations